Colin Ellsworth Laurie Stuart (born 28 September 1973) is a Guyanese cricketer, who has played for the West Indies.

In six Test matches, Stuart, who was a right-hand batsman, had a batting average of 3.42 average, and as a right-arm, medium-fast bowler, has taken 20 wickets with a 31.39 average.

Stuart took part in the only instance in Test cricket history, when three bowlers were used in completing one over. In 2001, playing against the hosts, Sri Lanka at the Asgiriya Stadium in Kandy, Mervyn Dillon contracted abdominal pains after bowling two balls of his third over.  Stuart replaced him, only to be banned from bowling for the remainder of Sri Lanka's innings, by the umpire, John Hampshire, after delivering two high, fast full-tosses (called as no-balls) in his first three balls. Chris Gayle then bowled the final three legitimate deliveries of the over.

References

1973 births
Living people
Guyanese cricketers
Sportspeople from Georgetown, Guyana
West Indies One Day International cricketers
West Indies Test cricketers
Guyana cricketers